PTGS2 antisense NFKB1 complex-mediated expression regulator RNA is a protein that in humans is encoded by the PACERR gene.

Function

This gene represents transcription of a long non-coding RNA produced in antisense to the prostaglandin-endoperoxide synthase 2 (PTGS2) gene. This transcript interacts with NF-kB transcriptional regulators to promote expression of PTGS2.

References

Further reading